2-Ethylhexyl diphenyl phosphate (Octicizer) is an organophosphate compound. It acts as both a plasticizer and flame retardant in PVC, its wide liquid range also makes it suitable as a flame retardant in hydraulic fluids. It has low acute toxicity in feeding experiments, but has been implicated as a potential hormone mimetic.

References

Organophosphates
Flame retardants
Plasticizers